This is a list of notable hotels, current or former, in Spain ordered by autonomous region. The list mainly includes five and four star hotels.

Andalusia

Castillo de Santa Catalina (Jaén)
Convento de la Magdalena
Hotel Alfonso XIII
Hotel Anglo-Hispano
Hotel París (Huelva)
Hotel Sevilla (Algeciras)
Palacio del Deán Ortega

Málaga
Hotel Pez Espada (Torremolinos)

Marbella
Gran Hotel Gvadalpin Banús
Hotel Puente Romano
Marbella Club
Hotel Reina Cristina (Ronda)

Balearic Islands

Ibiza 

Hotel Montesol, Ibiza Town
Ibiza Gran Hotel, Ibiza Town

Majorca

Basque Country
Hotel La Perla

Catalonia
Hesperia Tower

Barcelona

Hotel Arts
Hotel Majestic
W Barcelona

Community of Madrid

Grand Hôtel de París
Hotel Florida
Hotel Palace
Hotel Puerta América
Hotel Ritz
Torre Sacyr Vallehermoso

Valencian Community
Gran Hotel Bali, Benidorm
Hotel Rio Park, Benidorm

References

 
Hotels
Spain